Thomas P. Kerwick (27 June 1885 – 9 February 1929) was an Irish hurler who played for the Tipperary senior team between 1906 and 1912.

Biography

Kerwick joined the team during the 1906 championship and was a regular member of the starting fifteen until his retirement after the 1912 championship. During that time he won two All-Ireland medals and three Munster medals.

At club level Kerwick won numerous county championship medals with Thurles Sarsfields.

Honours

Thurles Sarsfields
Tipperary Senior Hurling Championship (6): 1904, 1906, 1907, 1908, 1909, 1911

Tipperary
All-Ireland Senior Hurling Championship (2): 1906, 1908
Munster Senior Hurling Championship (3): 1906, 1908, 1909

References

1885 births
1929 deaths
Thurles Sarsfields hurlers
Tipperary inter-county hurlers
All-Ireland Senior Hurling Championship winners